Purwakarta–Bandung–Cileunyi Toll Road or shortened as Purbaleunyi Toll Road is a toll road in Indonesia, connecting Purwakarta Regency, West Bandung, Cimahi and the city and regency of Bandung.

Before fully connected, this toll road segment was Padalarang–Cileunyi only. From 2003 until 2005, the segment of Cikampek–Padalarang was constructed. Since then, this toll road is part of Jakarta–Cikampek Toll Road. The junction of both toll roads is located at kilometer 67. This toll road is famous for its scenic views, as well as notoriously known for its accidents on the Cipularang Segment.

Sections

Kilometres 67–122

The Purbaleunyi toll road starts from kilometre 67. This section is known as Cipularang. It connects Purwakarta Regency and West Bandung. This segment runs to a hill without any electricity, thus solar street lights have been installed. This section is notoriously known for its accidents, especially around kilometres 92-97. This section ends at Padalarang.

For technical aspects, Cipularang Toll Road has 2 lanes in each direction (with some little segments having a climbing lane for heavy vehicles). Unfortunately, this toll road may sometimes be closed for heavy vehicles traffic due to the difficult terrain to repair its condition. The famous event for this closure is Cisomang Bridge pillars break.

On 18 December 2022, Darangdan Toll Gate has been opened functionally as an access to Purwakarta Regency and West Bandung Regency. The toll gate was planned to be opened until 8 January 2022, and has remained operating since.

This toll road holds the record of longest exit-to-exit spans in Indonesia with Padalarang to Jatiluhur spans for 38 km without any other exits (for southbound) before being surpassed by Pematang Panggang–Kayuagung Toll Road in Sumatra, where the spans between Pematang Panggang and Kayuagung spans 91 km (KM239-KM330) without any exits between them.

Kilometres 122–155

This section is known as Padaleunyi. It crosses South Bandung, also acts as the third southern ring roads of Bandung Metropolitan Areas ; the second ring road is Soekarno-Hatta Street, Bandung, while the first ring road consists of many city roads. It ends at Cileunyi, although there's an extension project to go to Sumedang and Kertajati International Airport via Cisumdawu Toll Road. For the future, this toll road will be used a main line for Southern Java toll roads network through Gedebage–Tasikmalaya–Cilacap Toll Road.

Famous destinations on this segment are:
Bandung
Dago
Dayeuhkolot
Cibaduyut Shoe Market
Mount Tangkuban Perahu
Lembang
Soreang
Ciwidey
From KM125 to KM150, Jakarta-Bandung High Speed Railway parallels this toll road.

Facilities

Rest areas
Note that the toll road goes east–west from KM122-KM155, while from KM67-KM122, the direction is suggested south–north.

Toll gate
Note: The number on the exits is based on the distance from the western terminus of the Jakarta-Cikampek Toll Road, while the distance numbers are based on the distance from the western terminus of this toll road only

Pasteur Link

Bridges

See also
Jakarta–Cikampek Toll Road
Cikopo–Palimanan Toll Road
Jagorawi Toll Road

References

Toll roads in Indonesia
Transport in West Java
Toll roads in Java
Purwakarta Regency
West Bandung Regency
Cimahi
Bandung
Bandung Regency

External Links
PT Jasamarga Official Website